The Hillbrow Tower (formerly JG Strijdom Tower) is a tall tower located in the suburb of Hillbrow in Johannesburg, South Africa. At , it was the tallest structure and tower in Africa for 50 years, until it was surpassed in 2021 by the  Iconic Tower in Egypt's New Administrative Capital. For seven years it was also the tallest structure in the Southern Hemisphere until 1978, when surpassed by the 270 m Mount Isa Chimney in Queensland, Australia. It remains the tallest telecommunications tower in Africa, and the tallest structure in sub-Saharan Africa. Construction of the tower began in June 1968 and was completed three years later, in April 1971.  Construction cost 2 million Rand (at the time, US$2.8 million).  The tower was initially known as the JG Strijdom Tower, after JG (Hans) Strijdom, South African Prime Minister from 1954 to 1958. On 31 May 2005 it was renamed the Telkom Jo'burg Tower.

The tower was constructed for South African Posts & Telecommunications, which later became Telkom, South Africa's government run and the country's largest telecommunications company. As the general height of buildings rose in the central business district, it became necessary that the height of the new telecommunications tower stayed above the height of the buildings surrounding it.

Tourist attraction 
The Hillbrow Tower has been closed to visitors since 1981, primarily due to security reasons. Before the closure, the Hillbrow tower was one of the largest tourist draws in Johannesburg. The public was able to enter six public floors at the top of the tower. One of the floors housed a popular revolving restaurant named Heinrich's Restaurant, as well as another non-rotating restaurant known as the Grill Room and the observation floor which was at 197 m height.

During the 2010 FIFA World Cup, a huge football was fitted to the tower to celebrate the event. In 2013, television programme Carte Blanche broadcast from what used to be the revolving restaurant.

The Hillbrow Tower is one of two iconic towers that are often used to identify the Johannesburg skyline. The second tower, the Sentech Tower (old Albert Hertzog Tower), is used for television and radio transmissions.

Gallery

See also 
 List of towers
 Sentech Tower
 Carlton Centre

References

External links 

 Hillbrow Tower
 

Buildings and structures in Johannesburg
Towers completed in 1971
Towers in South Africa